Anthony Gerard Peter Robinson (born 9 May 1962) is a former Australian politician who served as the member for Mitcham in the Victorian Legislative Assembly. He represented the Labor Party.

Robinson was first elected at the 1997 Mitcham by-election. Since his by-election win, Robinson successfully defended his traditionally bellwether seat until 2010, and after the 2006 election he was appointed as Secretary to Cabinet. In August 2007, he was appointed as Minister for Gaming, Minister for Consumer Affairs and Minister Assisting the Premier on Veterans' Affairs. He was defeated in 2010, as a swing of greater than 5 per cent put Liberal candidate Dee Ryall in office.

He serves as AusNet Services Customer Forum Chair.

References

External links
 Tony Robinson in Parliamentary Handbook

1962 births
Living people
Members of the Victorian Legislative Assembly
Australian Labor Party members of the Parliament of Victoria
21st-century Australian politicians
Politicians from Melbourne